Cuban bread is a fairly simple white bread, similar to French bread and Italian bread, but has a slightly different baking method and ingredient list (in particular, it generally includes a small amount of fat in the form of lard or vegetable shortening); it is usually made in long, baguette-like loaves. It is a staple of Cuban-American cuisine and is traditionally the bread of choice when making an authentic Cuban sandwich.

History
 
The origins of "real" Cuban bread are debated, with both Miami and Tampa, Florida claiming to be the home of the best. With regards to where it originated, the first commercial bakery in the U.S. to produce Cuban bread was most likely La Joven Francesca bakery, which was established by the Sicilian-born Francisco Ferlita in 1896 in Ybor City, a thriving Cuban-Spanish-Italian community in Tampa. The bakery originally sold bread for 3 to 5 cents per loaf, many of which were delivered every morning like milk. Houses in Ybor City often had a sturdy nail driven into the door frame on the front porch, and a bread deliveryman would impale the fresh loaf of bread onto the nail before dawn.

Ferlita's bakery was destroyed by fire in 1922, leaving only the brick bread oven standing. It was rebuilt and expanded, and it soon became a major supplier of Cuban bread for the Tampa area. The bakery also added a dining area which became a place to congregate, drink a cup of Cuban coffee, and catch up on the local news. La Joven Francesca closed in 1973, but soon found new life when it was renovated and converted into the Ybor City State Museum. The original ovens where the original Cuban bread was baked are still viewable inside.

La Segunda Bakery in Ybor City is currently the largest producer of Cuban bread in the world and ships the product all over Florida and beyond. It was co-founded by Juan Morè, who migrated to Tampa from Spain via Cuba and became a partner in a bakery co-op with three locations: "La Primera", "La Segunda", and "La Tercera" (literally, The First, The Second, and The Third). Morè had been running La Primera, but when the other two bakeries closed in 1915, he bought the larger La Segunda building. His descendants have been running the bakery ever since, and it still uses Morè's original Cuban bread recipe and many of the same bread-making techniques.

Characteristics

It is not amiss to say that the Latins in Ybor City make a very fine bread, equal in all respects to the French article of that kind and unexcelled by the Vienna product.

-Tampa Daily Journal, 1896

A traditional loaf of Cuban bread is approximately three feet long and somewhat rectangular crossways (as compared to the rounder shape of Italian or French bread loaves). It has a hard, thin, almost papery toasted crust and a soft flaky center. In the early days, the dough was stretched thin to make it last, creating the bread's distinctive air pockets and long shape. As they have for over a century, La Segunda and a few other traditional Cuban bread producers lay a long, moist palmetto frond on top of the loaves before baking, creating a shallow trench in the upper crust, producing an effect similar to the slashing or scoring of a European-style loaf. (The frond is removed before eating.)

Cuban bread is the necessary base for a "Cuban sandwich" (sometimes called a "sandwich mixto"). It can also be served as a simple breakfast, especially toasted and pressed with butter and served alongside (and perhaps dunked into) a hot mug of cafe con leche (strong dark-roasted Cuban coffee with scalded milk).

Because the traditional recipe uses no preservatives, Cuban bread tends to go stale quickly and becomes hard and dry if not eaten soon after baking. However, it can be frozen for shipping or storage. In Tampa, stale Cuban bread became a key ingredient in other recipes, such as the breading of a deviled crab.

Other uses
Stale Cuban bread is the preferred "weapon of choice" in protests performed by the Conch Republic and in mock battles involving the "Ybor City Navy" during Tampa's Gasparilla Pirate Festival.

References

External links

Cuban Bread Recipe (uses the sponge method)
Commercial Cuban bread recipe from La Segunda Bakery in Tampa, Florida (uses the direct-yeast method)

American breads
Cuban cuisine
Cuban-American culture in Florida
Culture of Tampa, Florida